Issam Merdassi (Arabic: عصام المرداسي, born 16 March 1981) is a Tunisian footballer.

Merdassi played until 2006 for CS Sfaxien then went on loan to Saudi Al-Nassr before returning to CS Sfaxien for one season 2008-2009 and finally he was transferred to BSC Young Boys in summer 2009.

He was a member of the Tunisian 2004 Olympic football team, who exited in the first round, finishing third in group C, behind group and gold medal winners Argentina and runners-up Australia.

After managing Sfax Railways Sports, he was appointed manager of AS Rejiche in 2021.

References

1981 births
Living people
Tunisian footballers
Footballers at the 2004 Summer Olympics
Olympic footballers of Tunisia
Tunisia international footballers
CS Sfaxien players
Al Nassr FC players
BSC Young Boys players
Misr Lel Makkasa SC players
Tunisian Ligue Professionnelle 1 players
Saudi Professional League players
Tunisian expatriate footballers
Expatriate footballers in Saudi Arabia
Expatriate footballers in Switzerland
Expatriate footballers in Egypt
Tunisian expatriate sportspeople in Saudi Arabia
Tunisian expatriate sportspeople in Switzerland
Tunisian expatriate sportspeople in Egypt
Association football defenders
Tunisian football managers
Sfax Railways Sports managers
Tunisian Ligue Professionnelle 1 managers